Sendy Pratama (born January 4, 1997) is an Indonesian professional footballer who plays as a midfielder.

Club career

Persekat Tegal
He was signed for Persekat Tegal to play in Liga 2 in the 2020 season.

Career statistics

Club

References

External links
 Sendy Pratama at Liga Indonesia
 Sendy Pratama at Soccerway

1997 births
Living people
Indonesian footballers
Persik Kediri players
Association football midfielders
Sportspeople from Bandung